Nikki Webster is an Australian pop singer. She has released four studio albums, one compilation album and nine singles, in addition to ten music videos on record labels Gotham Records and Piller Records.

Webster rose to prominence after performing at the opening ceremony of the 2000 Summer Olympics. Her debut studio album, Follow Your Heart, was released in 2001. The following year, Webster released her second studio album, Bliss. The lead single "Something More Beautiful" reached  and received gold certification. Webster released her third studio album, Let's Dance, in 2004. The lead single "Dancing in the Street" reached . Later that year, she released a compilation album, The Best of Nikki Webster. As of February 2008, Webster is working on her fourth studio album. The lead single "Devilicious" reached .

Albums

Studio albums

Compilation albums

Singles

Music videos

References
General

Specific

Pop music discographies
Discographies of Australian artists